The political influence of Evangelicalism in Latin America is a phenomenon that has resulted in increased political influence and activism by the Evangelical Christian community in the region. Marginal at first, different news reports and political analysts have pointed the important weight that such community has and its impact in electoral politics, even helping in the electoral victories of conservative candidates.

Evangelical political parties are a particular type of political parties in Latin America generally linked or known to advocate for the interests of the Evangelical Christian community.

They are normally associated with certain stances like cultural conservatism, strong opposition to same-sex marriage and LGBT rights, legalization of abortion, drug liberalization and marijuana legalization, what they refer as "gender ideology" or identity politics, gun control and globalism. Although exceptions exist, they tend to be located on the right of the spectrum due to the Prosperity Theology associated to them, whilst supporting such things as death penalty, "hard hand" on crime, corporal punishment for minors and harder laws for juvenile delinquents.

History
Protestant missionary groups mainly from the Charismatic Movement originated in the Deep South of the United States were introduced deliberately as a strategy from Washington particularly during Republican administrations as a way to reduce the influence of left-leaning Catholic movements like Liberation theology (which was popular among many far-left political parties and guerrillas) and the more moderate Christian socialist and Christian Democratic parties. Guatemalan archbishop Próspero Penados also blamed the US for encouraging and sponsor Evangelicalism in Guatemala for, according to him, more political than religious reasons arguing that: "The diffusion of Protestantism in Guatemala is more part of an economic and political strategy" to oppose the Catholic social justice doctrine". Some conservative Catholics have blamed the prevalence of liberation theology among the clergy in Latin America for the exodus of believers to Evangelical Protestantism.

In recent decades, the Catholic Church has suffered a drain of followers, some of whom became irreligious, agnostics or atheists. Some also went to other alternative religions like Buddhism, Islam and new religious movements; but a large segment of former Catholics, particularly those of more humble origins and lower classes, went into the Evangelical Churches, with neo-Pentecostal and Charismatic movements proven popular amongst the converts. Pentecostalism also became popular among the lower income classes and the most abandoned sectors of society specially those of very poor and peripheral areas who see the Churches' ideas of economic growth through faith as an opportunity for social mobility. In any case, the growth of Evangelicals was quickly followed by their newly discovered political and electoral weight, with new forms of political activism and even the creation of specific political parties connected to their communities. Guatemalan dictator Efraín Ríos Montt was one of the first Evangelical Christians in attain power in Latin America's history.

Some examples of these movements include the support from the Evangelical Christian community to Jimmy Morales (himself an Evangelical) in Guatemala, Juan Orlando Hernández in Honduras, Mauricio Macri in Argentina, Sebastián Piñera in Chile The Evangelical opposition in the Colombian peace agreement referendum is considered for many pivotal in its rejection, as was the Evangelical parties' support of the impeachment of Dilma Rousseff in Brazil. Countries with notorious conservative right-wing candidates supported by Evangelicals include Venezuela where pastor Javier Bertucci was the third-most voted nominee, Costa Rica where preacher and gospel singer Fabricio Alvarado went into the electoral run-off and Brazil where Evangelical Christians were pivotal in the triumph of Jair Bolsonaro.

However, in some countries the alliance was with the left. The Authentic Renewal Organization is a Venezuelan Evangelical political party and member of the official Great Patriotic Pole of President Nicolás Maduro. Daniel Ortega was also supported by Evangelical pastors in Nicaragua and his wife and Vice President Rosario Murillo has links with Evangelical Churchers. The Social Encounter Party in Mexico is also unofficially linked to the Mexican Evangelical community (as the Mexican Constitution forbids the existence of confessional parties) and is a member of the Juntos Haremos Historia coalition that endorsed leftist Andrés Manuel López Obrador, a move that brought out criticism as it was a coalition with two left-wing parties.

Positions
The movement is generally characterized by its staunch cultural conservatism (even for Latin American standards) with a very strong opposition to same-sex marriage, LGBT rights, legalization of abortion, drug liberalization and marijuana legalization, "gender ideology" and identity politics, gun control and globalism. Some may hold strong anti-communist and anti-socialist positions and endorse neoliberal and pro-free market capitalist ideas in part due to the Prosperity Theology that many hold. Some conspiracy theories like Cultural Marxism and New World Order have proven popular among its base. South American Evangelicals also tend to follow Christian Zionism and be supporters of Israel, supporting policies such as the moving of the embassies of their countries to Jerusalem.

Some have been described also as supporters of the death penalty, "hard hand" on crime, Creationism (and opposition of teaching the scientific theories of Evolution and Big Bang on schools), corporal punishment for kids and harder laws for juvenile delinquents. Their most critical opponents signal them as having far-right, religious fundamentalist, theocratic, anti-democratic and authoritarian ideas wanting to replace democracy by theocracy.

Roman Catholics in Latin America tend to be relatively more left-wing in economics due to the traditional teachings of the Catholic social doctrine and the Christian Democracy. Evangelical Christians on the other hand are mostly from the neo-Pentecostal movement and thus believers in the Prosperity Theology which justify most of their neoliberal economic ideas.

Political positions in contrast to other groups

With Roman Catholics
 Social conservatism: According to the Pew Research Center: "Even though the Catholic Church opposes abortion and same-sex marriage, Catholics in Latin America tend to be less conservative than Protestants on these kinds of social issues. On average, Catholics are less morally opposed to abortion, homosexuality, artificial means of birth control, sex outside of marriage, divorce and drinking alcohol than are Protestants."
 Evolution: Catholics tend to be more accepting of evolution than Protestants.
 Economic liberalism: On the whole, Latin Americans embrace free-market principles, but Catholics also tend to be more economically progressive having a tendency of supporting more left-wing and the welfare state position in varying degrees from far-left Liberation Theology which permates in many left-wing parties, to much more moderate Christian socialist and Christian Democratic postures. Evangelicals on the other hand (although exceptions exists) tend to be economically right-wing, staunchly anti-communist and support liberal economy and capitalism. 
 Class: In Latin America most neo-Pentecostals and other Evangelicals are mostly from working class and lower-income groups, whilst Catholicism is still prevalent among middle and high classes and among professionals and the political elite.
 Christian Zionism: The Catholic position regarding the Arab–Israeli conflict may vary greatly, however and although strong Israel-supporters among Catholics is not unusual, anti-Zionism is also prevalent among both far-left (especially Liberation Theology and Christian Left Catholics) and the far-right (Traditionalists, Sedevacantistas, etc.). The Vatican has its diplomatic representation to the State of Israel in Tel Aviv and recognizes the State of Palestine advocating for a two-state solution, thus many centrist Catholics follow these lines. On the other hand, Evangelical Christians tend to be overwhelmingly pro-Israel due to traditionally Christian Zionism and support the recognition of Jerusalem as its capital.

With agnostics, atheist and nonreligious
Atheist, agnostics and non-religious people are the third largest group of Latin America behind Catholics and Protestants. Coincidences with the conservative neo-Pentecostal are scarce. Although exceptions exist, non-religious in Latin America tend to be strongly culturally liberal, generally more than the average Latin American, being much more likely to support such things like secularism, abortion, same-sex marriage and birth control than their Catholic counterparts and specially the neo-Pentecostal community. Nonreligious are also much more supportive of Palestine than Israel and come mostly from the middle and high class, especially the professional and intellectual camps. Although in economic and politics nonreligious may also support right-wing libertarian, liberal and economically conservative ideas, it is also slightly more common for secularists to be more on the left and center-left of the spectrum.

With other religiones
Brazil's Spiritualist community had criticized the Evangelical position on Human Rights, social justice and economic policies.

The Brazilian Muslim community is split on the issue of supporting or rejecting right-wing figures like Donald Trump and Jair Bolsonaro. Muslims in the West tend to be socially conservative but economically progressive.

Corruption cases

Brazil

Pastor Magno Malta 
Prominent pentecostal politicians in Brazil have been involved in cases of corruption and law violations. Since 2007 Federal deputy Pastor Magno Malta was in involved in many scandals including embezzlement, nepotism, bribing and emission of fake bill of goods.

Pastor Everaldo Pereira 
In 2012, Pastor Everaldo Pereira was convicted and ordered to pay his ex-wife, Katia Maia, an indemnity of R$ 85,000 (US$ 26,350) for material and moral damage. Pastor Everaldo asked the Justice Court of Rio de Janeiro (TJ-RJ) to overturn the decision and was acquitted by the Supreme Federal Court. In 2013, Pereira's ex-wife initiated in the Superior Court of Justice (STJ) a new judicial process, alleging that the pastor committed physical violence, followed by death threats. Katia Maia said that during the aggression there were "kicks and punches, that caused a puncture in [her] eardrum". Pereira, however, said he acted in legitimate self-defense after a car pursuit in the streets of Rio de Janeiro.

Pastor Marco Feliciano 
Federal deputy Pastor Marco Feliciano, one of the most prominent names of the PSC, stated that Africans were cursed by Noah, leading to accusations of racism.

The deputy was falsely accused with attempted rape and assault by 22-year-old Patricia Lelis, a PSC activist who attended the same church as the pastor. The deputy chief of staff, Talma Bauer, was arrested for initially being suspected of kidnapping the young woman and forcing her to record videos defending the deputy in order to dismiss the initial complaint. After a police inquiry, Bauer was released and the São Paulo Civil Police concluded that there was no kidnapping or aggression, and requested the arrest of Patrícia Lélis for the crimes of slanderous denunciation and extortion against Bauer.

Guatemala

Jimmy Morales 
In January 2017, Samuel "Sammy" Morales, the older brother and close adviser to Guatemalan President Jimmy Morales, whose campaign slogan was, "neither corrupt, nor a crook", as well as one of Morales' sons, José Manuel Morales, were arrested on corruption and money laundering charges. According to media reports, the arrests prompted several large protests of up to 15,000 people demanding for President Morales' removal.

Jimmy Morales ordered the expulsion of Colombian Iván Velásquez, commissioner of the International Commission Against Impunity in Guatemala (CICIG), after it began "investigating claims that his party took illegal donations, including from drug-traffickers" and asked "congress to strip him of immunity from prosecution." After Minister of foreign affairs Carlos Raul Morales refused to sign the executive order, he was removed from office along with viceminister Carlos Ramiro Martínez. The Constitutional Court of Guatemala finally blocked the move.

Furthermore, former cabinet minister Édgar Gutiérrez accused Jimmy Morales of having sexually abused young female public workers with complicity of other government officials.

Criticism
Some parties and candidates are criticized for being supporters of Creationism over the scientific theories of Evolution and Big Bang, or for believing in conspiracy theories like Cultural Marxism, Gender ideology and New World Order.

They are also often accused of far-right, religious fundamentalist, theocratic, anti-democratic and authoritarian ideologies, or for planning to replace democracy with theocracy.

Political parties

Bibliography
 Colbi, Gerald. Dennett, Charlotte. (1996), Thy Will Be Done: The Conquest of the Amazon : Nelson Rockefeller and Evangelism in the Age of Oil
 Freston, Paul (2008). Evangelical Christianity and Democracy in Latin America. Print . Oxford Publishing.

See also
 Pink Tide
 Conservative wave
 Catholic social teaching
 Christian democracy
 Christian libertarianism
 Christianity and politics
 Political Catholicism
 Rerum novarum
 Social justice

References

Evangelicalism in South America
Christianity and political ideologies
Politics of South America
Conservatism in South America
Conservatism in North America
History of South America
United States–South American relations
United States–Central American relations
Christian political parties